KLAN (93.5 FM, "Mix 93") is a radio station licensed to serve Glasgow, Montana.  The station, owned by Glasgow Broadcasting Corp, airs the Rick Dees Weekly Top 40 every Sunday. It airs a hot adult contemporary music format.

The station was assigned the KLAN call letters by the Federal Communications Commission on March 2, 1983.

It and its sister station, KLTZ (1240 AM), are managed by Tim Phillips, who also serves as the Program Director. Production staff includes Program Director/General Manager Tim Phillips, News and Sports Director Stan "Boomer" Ozark, Leila Seyfert, Maxwell Knodel, Fynn Sukut, and Keirsten Wethern. Gwen Page serves as the Traffic Manager and Receptionist; Georgie Kulczyk serves as the Office Manager.

References

External links
KLAN official website

LAN
Hot adult contemporary radio stations in the United States
Glasgow, Montana